Bejucal Municipal Museum is a museum located in the 13th street in Bejucal, Cuba. It was established on 8 January 1981.

The museum holds collections on history, weaponry, ethnography, decorative arts and numismatics.

See also 
 List of museums in Cuba

References 

Museums in Cuba
Buildings and structures in Mayabeque Province
Museums established in 1981
1981 establishments in Cuba
20th-century architecture in Cuba